The 13121 / 13122 Ghazipur City–Kolkata Weekly Express is an Express train belonging to Eastern Railway zone that runs between Ghazipur City and Kolkata in India. It is currently being operated with 13122/13121 train numbers on a weekly basis.

Service

The 13122/Ghazipur City–Kolkata Express has an average speed of 52 km/hr and covers 743 km in 14h 20m . The 13121/Kolkata–Ghazipur City Express has an average speed of 50 km/hr and covers 743 km in 15h.

Route & halts

The important halts of the train are:

Coach composition

The train has standard LHB rakes with max speed of 110 kmph. The train consists of 18 coaches:

 1 AC II Tier
 3 AC III Tier
 6 Sleeper coaches
 6 General
 2 Head on Generation

Traction

It is hauled by a Howrah-based WAP-7 (HOG)-equipped locomotive from Ghazipur City to Kolkata and vice versa.

Rake sharing

The trains shares its rake with 22324 / 22323 Shabd Bhedi Superfast Express.

See also 

 Kolkata railway station
 Ghazipur City railway station
 Shabd Bhedi Superfast Express
 Suhaildev Superfast Express

Notes

References

External links 

 13122/Kolkata - Ghazipur City Weekly Express India Rail Info
 13121/Ghazipur City - Kolkata Weekly Express India Rail Info

Transport in Kolkata
Transport in Ghazipur
Express trains in India
Rail transport in West Bengal
Rail transport in Jharkhand
Rail transport in Bihar
Rail transport in Uttar Pradesh
Railway services introduced in 2016